Awa Ly N'diaye (born 15 January 2000) is a Senegalese swimmer. She competed in the women's 50 metre freestyle event at the 2016 Summer Olympics. She was disqualified and did not advance to the semi-finals.

References

External links
 

2000 births
Living people
Senegalese female swimmers
Olympic swimmers of Senegal
Swimmers at the 2016 Summer Olympics
Place of birth missing (living people)
Senegalese female freestyle swimmers
21st-century Senegalese women